The Order of the Unity of the Nation  is the highest order of Syria.

History 
The order was founded on 12 July 1934.

Classes 
The order is composed of the following classes :
 Member 1st Class 
 Member 2nd Class 
 Member 3rd Class

Insignia 
 The sash is green with thin black borders and white stripes.

Recipients 
 Abdullah of Saudi Arabia
 Al-Waleed bin Talal
 Anwar Sadat
 Elias IV of Antioch
 Juan Domingo Perón
 Émile Lahoud
 Farouk of Egypt
 Giorgio Napolitano
 Haile Selassie
 Hosni Mubarak
 Hugo Chávez
 Hussein of Jordan
 Isa bin Salman Al Khalifa
 Mohammed V of Morocco
 Mohammad Reza Pahlavi
 Mustafa Tlass
 Qaboos bin Said al Said
 Sirajuddin of Perlis
 Suharto
 Siti Hartinah 
 Anatoly Bibilov

References

External links 
 Pictures of the Order

Orders, decorations, and medals of Syria
Awards established in 1934
1934 establishments in Mandatory Syria